The Lord High Admiral of Scotland was one of the Great Officers of State of the Kingdom of Scotland before the Union with England in 1707.

The office was one of considerable power, also known as Royal Scottish Admiralty, including command of the King's ships and sailors (see Royal Scottish Navy) and inspection of all sea ports, harbours, and sea coasts. The Admiral appointed judges to decide causes relating to maritime affairs, including both civil and criminal jurisdiction, and jurisdiction over creeks, fresh and navigable waterways. The duties were exercised through Vice-Admirals and Admirals-Depute, later called Judge Admirals.

The office seems to have originated in the early 15th century and was once held by Sir Robert Logan of Grugar, later also of Restalrig and the Earls of Bothwell and the Dukes of Lennox. It was one of the heritable offices that Charles II gave to his illegitimate son Charles Lennox, 1st Duke of Richmond and Lennox.

The earliest surviving records of the Scottish High Court of Admiralty date from 1557, convened under the authority of the Earl of Bothwell, in Edinburgh or Leith. Although all maritime causes in Scotland below a river's first bridge were in its view, it was inferior to the Court of Session, and its authority was contested by the Court of Justiciary in criminal matters. The Court was formally to be held, fenced, within the sea-flood and wherever it was actually held the Admiral would declare that to be the case. The judges were Bothwell's two vice-admirals, men otherwise unknown who were almost certainly professional lawyers rather than mariners.

By the Act of Union 1707 all admiralty jurisdictions were placed under the Lord High Admiral of Great Britain or Commissioners of the Admiralty. Nevertheless, the Vice-Admiral of Scotland who received his commission from the Crown continued to appoint the Judge Admiral (until 1782) and Admirals-depute and to rank as an Officer of the Crown.

The Public Offices (Scotland) Act 1817 provided that no person thereafter appointed as Vice Admiral should receive a salary. The Admiralty Court in Edinburgh was abolished in 1830 and the Court of Session granted subject-matter jurisdiction.

List of Lord High Admirals

 The 1st Earl of Orkney
 George, 1st Earl of Caithness (Third Creation)
 William, 1st Earl of Caithness (Fourth Creation)
 The 1st Duke of Montrose
 The 1st Duke of Albany
 Sir Robert Logan of Grugar, later also of Restalrig 1400
 The 1st Earl of Crawford before 1403
 The 1st Earl of Bothwell appointed 1488.
    The 1st Earl of Arran sailed with royal fleet 1502, 1504–5, 1513
    The 5th Earl of Angus
    The 5th Lord Maxwell
 The 2nd Earl of Bothwell appointed 1508 in succession to his father.
 The 3rd Earl of Bothwell appointed 1513, duties performed by Patrick Hepburn, Prior of St. Andrews.
 The 4th Earl of Bothwell appointed 1556.
 The 4th Earl of Morton appointed 1568.
 The 1st Earl of Bothwell (Second Creation) appointed 1581, confirmed 1587.
 The 2nd Duke of Lennox appointed 1591.
 The 4th Duke of Lennox 1626
 The 2nd Earl of Kincardine 1668
 James, Duke of York and Albany 1673
 The Duke of Hamilton 1692
 Charles, 1st Duke of Richmond and 1st Duke of Lennox 1694
 The 1st Duke of Montrose 1702
 The 4th Earl of Wemyss 1706–1707, thereafter Vice-Admiral

List of Vice Admirals
 1708 The 4th Earl of Wemyss
 1714 The 9th Earl of Rothes
 1727 The 3rd Duke of Queensberry
 1729 The 2nd Earl of Stair
 1733 The 13th Earl of Morton
 1738 The 5th Earl of Findlater
 1764 The 3rd Earl of Hyndford
 1767 The 4th Duke of Queensberry
 1776 The 3rd Earl of Breadalbane and Holland
 1782 Lord William Gordon, son of The 3rd Duke of Gordon
 The 1st Earl Cathcart

References

Stair Memorial Encyclopaedia of the Laws of Scotland

 
Lord High Admiral
Royal Scots Navy
Lists of admirals